Ethylenetetracarboxylic acid is an organic compound with formula , or (HO(OC)-)2C=C(-(CO)OH)2.

By removal of four protons, the acid yields the anion , ethylenetetracarboxylate, which is one of the oxocarbon anions (consisting solely of oxygen and carbon). The same names are used for the corresponding esters.

The acid can be obtained by hydrolysis of tetraethyl ethylenetetracarboxylate, which in turn can be obtained from diethyl dibromomalonate with sodium iodide.

Ethylenetetracarboxylic dianhydride, a twofold acid anhydride of this compound, can be formed by direct dehydration at high temperature.

References

Carboxylic acids